Cyrtodactylus wallacei is a species of gecko, a lizard in the family Gekkonidae. The species is endemic to Sulawesi.

Etymology
The specific name, wallacei, is in honor of British naturalist Alfred Russel Wallace.

Description

Reproduction
C. wallacei is oviparous.

References

Further reading
Hayden CJ, Brown RM, Gillespie GR, Setiadi MI, Linkem CW, Iskandar DT, Umileala, Bickford DP, Riyanto A, Mumpuni, McGuire JA (2008). "A New Species of Bent-Toed Gecko Cyrtodactylus Gray, 1827, (Squamata: Gekkonidae) from the Island of Sulawesi, Indonesia". Herpetologica 64 (1): 109–120. (Cyrtodactylus wallacei, new species).
Mecke S, Hartmann L, Mader F, Kieckbusch M, Kaiser H (2016). "Redescription of Cyrtodactylus fumosus (Müller, 1895) (Reptilia: Squamata: Gekkonidae), with a revised identification key to the bent-toed geckos of Sulawesi". Acta Herpetologica 11 (2): 151–160.

Cyrtodactylus
Reptiles described in 2008